Weissenstein Pass (el. 1284 m.) is a high mountain pass in the Jura Mountains in the canton of Solothurn in Switzerland.

It connects Oberdorf and Gänsbrunnen. The pass road has a maximum grade of 22 percent and is one of the steepest roads in Switzerland.

See also
 List of highest paved roads in Europe
 List of mountain passes
List of the highest Swiss passes

Mountain passes of Switzerland
Mountain passes of the Jura
Mountain passes of the canton of Solothurn